The Troyer Sportplane VX is an American aircraft that was designed for homebuilt construction.

Design and development
The Sportsman VX is a mid-wing, open cockpit aircraft with conventional landing gear. The fuselage is made from welded steel tubing with aircraft fabric covering, the wing construction is all-wood with spruce spars.

Specifications (Troyer VX)

See also

References

Homebuilt aircraft